Suseema is a 2011 Sri Lankan Sinhala-language musical romance film directed by Rohan Welivita through his teledrama by the same name and novel by Janaka Ratnayake. The film produced by ASP Liyanage for Fine Vision Films. It stars Suraj Mapa and Paboda Sandeepani in lead roles along with Saranga Disasekara and Robin Fernando. Music composed by Nimal Mendis. The film was filmed by latest B2 HD camera with AVC-Intra recording format, which handled by Sumedha Liyanage, the cinematographer of the project. It is the 1165th Sri Lankan film in the Sinhala cinema.

Plot 
Ranga and nàlanka are young musicians.

Cast 
 Suraj Mapa as Ranga
 Paboda Sandeepani as Suseema
 Saranga Disasekara as Asela
 Upeksha Swarnamali
 Amila Abeysekara
 Robin Fernando as Suseema's father
 Kapila Sigera
 Nirosha Thalagala

Soundtrack

References 

2011 films
2010s Sinhala-language films